These are the rosters of all participating teams at the men's water polo tournament at the 1996 Summer Olympics in Atlanta.

Croatia
The following players represented Croatia:

Maro Balić 
Perica Bukić 
Damir Glavan 
Igor Hinić 
Vjekoslav Kobešćak 
Joško Kreković
Ognjen Kržić 
Dubravko Šimenc 
Siniša Školneković 
Ratko Štritof
Renato Vrbičić
Tino Vegar
Zdeslav Vrdoljak

Greece
The following players represented Greece:

Georgios Afroudakis
Symeon Georgaras
Filippos Kaiafas
Theodoros Kalakonas
Thomas Khatzis
Theodoros Chatzitheodorou
Theodoros Lorantos
Konstantinos Loudis
Georgios Mavrotas
Tasos Papanastasiou
Vangelis Patras
Georgios Psykhos
Gerasimos Voltyrakis

Germany
The following players represented Germany:

Ingo Borgmann
Piotr Bukowski
Oliver Dahler
Jörg Dresel
Torsten Dresel
Davor Erjavec
Michael Ilgner
Dirk Klingenberg
Raúl de la Peña
René Reimann
Uwe Sterzik
Lars Tomanek
Daniel Voß

Hungary
The following players represented Hungary:

Tibor Benedek
Tamás Dala
Rajmund Fodor
András Gyöngyösi
Tamás Kásás
Zoltán Kósz
Péter Kuna
Attila Monostori
Zsolt Németh
Frank Tóth
László Tóth
Zsolt Varga
Balázs Vincze

Italy
The following players represented Italy:

Alberto Angelini
Francesco Attolico 
Fabio Bencivenga
Alessandro Bovo 
Alessandro Calcaterra
Roberto Calcaterra 
Marco Gerini 
Alberto Ghibellini 
Luca Giustolisi
Amedeo Pomilio
Francesco Postiglione
Carlo Silipo 
Leonardo Sottani

Netherlands
The following players represented the Netherlands:

Arie van de Bunt
Gert de Groot
Arno Havenga
Koos Issard
Bas de Jong
Niels van der Kolk
Marco Kunz
Harry van der Meer
Hans Nieuwenburg
Joeri Stoffels
Eelco Uri
Wyco de Vries

Romania
The following players represented Romania:

Edward Andrei
Florin Bonca
Robert Dinu
Niculae Fulgeanu
Vlad Hagiu
Gelu Lisac
Istvan Moldvai
Daniel Radu
Bogdan Rath
Radu Sabău
Ștefan Sanda
Dinel Stemate
Liviu Totolici

Russia
The following players represented Russia:

Dmitry Apanasenko
Dmitry Dugin
Sergey Garbuzov
Dmitry Gorshkov
Sergey Ivlev
Vladimir Karabutov
Ilya Konstantinov
Nikolay Kozlov
Nikolay Maksimov
Aleksey Panfili
Yury Smolovoy
Aleksandr Yeryshov
Sergey Yevstigneyev

Spain
The following players represented Spain:

Josep Maria Abarca
Ángel Andreo
Daniel Ballart
Manuel Estiarte
Pedro García
Salvador Gómez
Iván Moro
Miki Oca
Jorge Payá
Sergi Pedrerol
Jesús Rollán
Carles Sans
Jordi Sans

Ukraine
The following players represented Ukraine:

Dmytro Andriyev
Ihor Horbach
Vadym Kebalo
Vitaliy Khalchaytskiy
V'iacheslav Kostanda
Andriy Kovalenko
Oleksandr Potulnytskiy
Vadym Rozhdestvenskiy
Vadym Skuratov
Anatoliy Solodun
Dmitry Stratan
Oleh Volodymyrov
Oleksiy Yehorov

United States
The following players represented the United States:

Gavin Arroyo
Troy Barnhart Jr.
Chris Duplanty
Mike Evans
Kirk Everist
Dan Hackett
Chris Humbert
Kyle Kopp
Jeremy Laster
Rick McNair
Chris Oeding
Alex Rousseau
Wolf Wigo

Yugoslavia
The following players represented Yugoslavia:

Viktor Jelenić
Igor Milanović
Ranko Perović
Dejan Savić
Vaso Subotić
Aleksandar Šapić
Aleksandar Šoštar
Milan Tadić
Petar Trbojević
Veljko Uskoković
Mirko Vičević
Vladimir Vujasinović
Predrag Zimonjić

References

Men's team rosters
 
1996